Eagle Island is an island in Maine's Casco Bay and the site of the retirement home of the polar explorer Admiral Robert Peary (1856-1920). The island and home are preserved as the Eagle Island State Historic Site.

History
Peary bought the island in 1881 and retired there in 1911, after he had achieved fame and glory with his (sometimes disputed) expedition to the North Pole. His family continued to live in the house until the property was donated to the people of Maine in 1967. Eagle Island was listed on the National Register of Historic Places in 1971 and declared a National Historic Landmark in 2014.

Description
Island
Eagle Island is a  island in the outermost portion of the archipelago of islands that make up Casco Bay. Most of the island is covered with conifers and brush; there are trails providing access to most of the island. The island was purchased by Admiral Peary in 1881. At the northern end of the island is a Y-shaped clearing in which the site's buildings are located, and a small beach area with a long wooden pier. There are three major structures on the island in addition to the pier: the Peary house, a caretaker's cabin, and a visitors center. The pier was constructed in 1969, and the visitors center in 2012. The gardens planted by Mrs. Peary are maintained by park staff.

Estate
The Peary House is a wood-frame house, built in several stages. The original portion of the house was built in 1904, and consisted of a rectangular structure with a single large living room on the first floor and three bedrooms on the second floor. Meals were prepared in the caretaker's house, an apparently inadequate situation that prompted the construction of a small kitchen and dining wing in 1906. A new fieldstone foundation with concrete piers was built, raising the structure onto a full-height basement, and shed-roof dormers were added to each side of the gabled roof. Following his retirement, Peary embarked on a further expansion of the building in 1912–13. The 1906 kitchen wing was detached, and a new expanded wing added, with a porch on three sides. Peary also built a pair of circular stone bastions, which served in part as a retaining wall to keep the house from being blown into the water during stormy weather. One of these bastions Peary used to house his artifact collection from his many expeditions.

After Peary's death in 1920, his family made only modest alterations before giving the property to the state in 1967. The state built the pier and undertook restoration of the property, which had suffered deterioration due to weather. A portion of the Peary house's roof caved in during 1990, resulting in water damage to Peary's study, and necessitating reconstruction of that part of the house.

See also
List of National Historic Landmarks in Maine
National Register of Historic Places listings in Cumberland County, Maine
List of islands of Maine

References

External links
Eagle Island State Historic Site Department of Agriculture, Conservation and Forestry
Friends of Peary's Eagle Island

Islands of Cumberland County, Maine
Houses on the National Register of Historic Places in Maine
National Historic Landmarks in Maine
Protected areas of Cumberland County, Maine
Houses in Cumberland County, Maine
Museums in Cumberland County, Maine
Historic house museums in Maine
Biographical museums in Maine
Maine state historic sites
Harpswell, Maine
Islands of Casco Bay
National Register of Historic Places in Cumberland County, Maine
Islands of Maine
Protected areas established in 1967